Movil (also Romanized as Movīl and Mū’īl; also known as Mūbel and Mūl) is a village in Dasht Rural District, in the Central District of Meshgin Shahr County, Ardabil Province, Iran. At the 2006 census, its population was 1,400, in 302 families.

Name 
According to Vladimir Minorsky, the name "Movil" is derived from the Mongolian word moyl, referring to the bird cherry (Prunus padus).

References 

Towns and villages in Meshgin Shahr County